Pewamo-Westphalia High School is a public high school in Westphalia, Michigan, United States. It is part of the Pewamo-Westphalia Community Schools district and was established in September 1961.

Academics 
In 2019, Pewamo-Westphalia High School was ranked among the top 15 best high schools in Michigan by U.S. News & World Report, and 615th in the nation.

In 2017-2018, the school led Clinton County with the highest 11th grade M-STEP scores in science and social studies, had the highest average SAT score (1119.5) in the county, and ranked in the top 50 highest SAT scores in the state of Michigan (44th).

Athletics 
The Pewamo-Westphalia athletic teams are known as the Pirates and the school colors are blue and gold.  The Pirates compete in the Central Michigan Athletic Conference.  The following Michigan High School Athletic Association-sanctioned sports are offered at Pewamo-Westphalia High School:

 Baseball (boys)
 Basketball (girls and boys)
 Bowling (girls and boys)
 Competitive cheerleading (girls)
 Cross country (girls and boys)
 Football (boys)
 Golf (girls and boys)
 Track & field (girls and boys)
 Volleyball (girls)

On January 29, 2019, the Pirates were the subject of an article in the Lansing State Journal about the athletic success and strong community support.

References

External links 
 

Schools in Clinton County, Michigan
Public middle schools in Michigan
Public high schools in Michigan
Educational institutions established in 1961
1961 establishments in Michigan